

Promotion

The song was used as the theme song for the animated film Naruto Shippuden 4: The Lost Tower, and also used as a television commercial campaign for Recochoku.

Track listing

Charts

Certifications and sales

References

External links
Sony Music If profile 

2010 singles
Kana Nishino songs
RIAJ Digital Track Chart number-one singles
Japanese-language songs
Japanese film songs
Naruto songs
Songs written for animated films
2010 songs
SME Records singles